Vegard Samdahl (born March 21, 1978) is a Norwegian handballer, currently playing for Polish Ekstraklasa Men's Handball League side Wisła Płock. He has played for Sweden's Stavanger IF, Elitserien level club IFK Skövde and Danmarks Håndbold Forbund club Aarhus GF.

Samdahl has made 7 appearances for the Norway men's national handball team.

External links
 Player info

1978 births
Living people
Norwegian male handball players
Norwegian expatriate sportspeople in Sweden
Norwegian expatriate sportspeople in Denmark
Norwegian expatriate sportspeople in Poland